The Visual Studio Industry Partner (VSIP) Program (formerly Visual Studio Integration Program) allows third-party developers and software vendors to develop tools, components and languages for use in the Microsoft Visual Studio .NET IDE. The program offers partnership benefits including co-marketing opportunities, and Visual Studio licensing options as well as extended access to Microsoft technical and premier support.

The VSIP SDK (software development kit) facilitates development of integrated tools and includes development software and documentation that can be used within the Visual Studio .NET IDE directly. Extensions to the IDE, also known as "Add-ins", can be as simple as adding a custom server control to the toolbox, or as complex as adding support for a new CLR-compliant language.

Visual Studio Express is limited and does not support third-party extensions.

External links
 Visual Studio Industry Partner home page
 Microsoft Developer Network (MSDN)
 Visual Studio Extensibility Center

Microsoft Visual Studio extensions